Aleksandr Sergeyevich Ignatyev (born 7 November 1971) is a former Russian professional footballer.

Club career
He made his professional debut in the Soviet Second League in 1990 for FC Dynamo Leningrad.

Honours
 Russian Premier League bronze: 2000.

References

1971 births
Footballers from Saint Petersburg
Living people
Soviet footballers
Russian footballers
Association football midfielders
FC Zenit Saint Petersburg players
FC Dynamo Saint Petersburg players
FC Zhemchuzhina Sochi players
FC Elista players
FC Torpedo Moscow players
FC Torpedo-2 players
FC Lokomotiv Nizhny Novgorod players
FC Sibir Novosibirsk players
FC Petrotrest players
FC Kyzylzhar players
FC Taraz players
Russian Premier League players
Kazakhstan Premier League players
Russian expatriate footballers
Expatriate footballers in Kazakhstan
Russian expatriate sportspeople in Kazakhstan
FC Lokomotiv Saint Petersburg players